Roystead Railway Station was a railway station on the Outer Circle railway line, in the suburb of Canterbury, in Melbourne, Australia. It was opened on 14 May 1900, as "Stanley", to serve passengers on the so-called Deepdene Dasher shuttle service. This section of the line was in a cutting, and the station, with a single platform on the west side, was located south of a bridge, with red brick abutments and a green-painted iron superstructure, which took Mont Albert Road over the railway.

Originally named after the adjacent Stanley Grove, the name was altered to "Balwyn" in 1902, and finally to Roystead in September 1923, after the white, Victorian style house nearby, which is now used by Camberwell Grammar, a private boys' school. The station closed on 9 October 1927, along with the passenger service, but goods trains to East Kew railway station passed through the site until 1943.

References
 

Railway stations in Australia opened in 1900
Railway stations closed in 1927
Disused railway stations in Melbourne